Vi är svenska fotbollsgrabbar is a song written by Georg "Åby" Ericson, and used as a fight song for the Swedish national team during the 1974 FIFA World Cup in West Germany. The song recording featured Georg "Åby" Ericson playing the piano, and the players themselves sang.

Sweden ended up 5th in the tournament, which was considered a success, and the song became popular. The song also became a Svensktoppen hit between 30 June-21 July 1974, with two fifth positions being followed up by one 7th and one 9th position.

Before the 2002 FIFA World Cup in Japan and South Korea, Magnus Uggla covered the song.

References

1974 songs
Swedish songs
Swedish-language songs
Magnus Uggla songs
Songs about Sweden
Football songs and chants